Ramon Victor Agas Bautista is a Filipino former actor, comedian, television host, film producer, writer, commercial model, and educator. He is a self-proclaimed "Internet Action Star".

Bautista graduated from the University of the Philippines Diliman College of Mass Communication where he earned his degree in film and audio-visual communications. He is currently teaching Film at the same university.

He made his first television appearance as he played various characters in Strangebrew, a comedy-reality show television series aired from 2001 to 2003. In 2012, he published his book, Bakit Hindi Ka Crush ng Crush Mo?, about a man who began to respect a woman after a makeover. The book was adapted to a film with the same name the next year. In 2013, he gained popularity among Filipino netizens when he published his YouTube online relationship advice series, Tales from the Friend Zone (TFTFZ).

Bautista also hosted the comedy science programs Science of Stupid on National Geographic, and You Have Been Warned Asia on Discovery Channel.

In 2014, Davao City officials declared him as persona non grata for his derogatory jokes against women from Davao. Among the leaders who expressed disappointment were Sara Duterte and Paolo Duterte.

Filmography
The following is the list of movies and series in which Ramon Bautista has appeared in various roles:

Movies

Television

Music Videos

Authored books

References

External links
 
 

Living people
People from Quezon City
Filipino male film actors
Filipino male comedians
Filipino television personalities
Filipino YouTubers
Filipino screenwriters
Filipino film producers
Filipino educators
Filipino male writers
University of the Philippines Diliman alumni
Academic staff of the University of the Philippines
21st-century screenwriters
1986 births
Filipino male television actors